John Edwin may refer to:

 John Edwin (1749–1790), English actor
 John Edwin (1768–1805), his son, English actor